Terry Cook (born February 26, 1968) is an American former stock car racing driver, best known for his time in the NASCAR Craftsman Truck Series. He was married to former Craftsman Truck pit reporter Amy East, and brother-in-law to driver Bobby East. He was previously the spotter and driver coach for the late John Wes Townley and Athenian Motorsports, after serving as the competition director for Red Horse Racing.

Early and personal life
Terry Cook is the son of Harold Cook, a former driver and mechanic, and Laureen Cook. He also has a brother Jerry (not to be confused with the NASCAR Hall of Famer of the same name), who competed in a single Truck Series race and seven ARCA Racing Series events. The two brothers worked on father Harold's car as teenagers.

Cook graduated from Sylvania Northview High School in 1986, two years after his brother.

Racing career

Cook began racing on a professional level in 1987 at Flat Rock Speedway and Toledo Speedway, collecting eleven wins in his first year of competition. Cook doubled his win total in 1988 before he moved up to super late models. He won the track championship in 1989 and 1990 at Flat Rock Speedway. Cook then went on to win the Super Late Model Championship at Toledo Speedway in 1992 and again at Sandusky Speedway in 1995.

Cook was set to make his NASCAR Craftsman Truck Series debut in 1995, but an injury at Toledo curtailed those plans. Cook made his Truck Series debut in 1996 at The Milwaukee Mile. Qualifying the #88 Sealmaster Racing (now ThorSport Racing) Chevrolet Silverado 24th, he finished 24th, three laps down. He ran two additional races that season for Sealmaster, finishing 23rd at Phoenix International Raceway. In 1997, Cook ran fifteen races during the season, with sponsorship from the PBA Tour. He won his first career pole at Flemington Speedway and posted a best finish of fifteenth twice.

Cook ran the full schedule in 1998. He won his first career race at Flemington and had six top-ten finishes, ending the season 20th in the final points. Due to a lack of primary sponsorship in 1999, Cook only posted three top-ten finishes before Big Daddy's BBQ Sauce came on board towards the end of the season, when he finished fifteenth in the standings. In 2000, PickupTruck.com became the team's primary sponsor, and despite seven top-tens, Cook was released with one race to go for Matt Crafton. He drove for K Automotive Racing at the season finale, finishing seventh. He drove K Automotive's #29 Ford F-150 full-time in 2001, winning the pole at Nazareth Speedway and finishing a career-high seventh in points.

In 2002, Cook won a career best four races and two poles, but dropped to eighth in points. He won an additional two poles in 2003, but did not finish in the top-five all season. He joined ppc Racing's fledgling truck team in 2004. Despite winning the pole at the season-opening Florida Dodge Dealers 250, he dropped to sixteenth in the standings. He moved up one spot in points in 2005 after posting two top-fives.

In 2006, Cook grabbed a win at Kansas Speedway and finished eighth in points. With no sponsorship at ppc, he left the team after the 2006 season to replace Chad Chaffin at HT Motorsports. He had four top tens and finished fourteenth in points, but was released at the end of the season. He signed to drive for Wyler Racing in 2008 and had an additional seven top-tens but was released before the season was over in favor of Jack Sprague. He immediately rejoined HT Motorsports for the remainder of the season. At the end of 2008, HT renumbered his truck to the #25, and Cajun Industries and Harris Trucking shared sponsorship duties of the truck. With two races to go in the season, Cook was released from HT. He drove the next race in the #02 Koma Unwind Chevy for Corrie Stott Racing, but was unable to find a ride for the season-ending Ford 200, ending a streak of 296 consecutive races started in the Truck Series.

In addition to his Truck Series efforts, Cook made several starts for MSRP Motorsports (now Phil Parsons Racing) in the Nationwide Series. In 2008, Cook ran 7 Nationwide races with MSRP, followed by twenty 2009 races, failed to qualify for three races. All of Cook's Nationwide starts were start-and-parks.

Cook was signed to drive the #46 Dodge in the Sprint Cup Series for the newly formed Whitney Motorsports in 2010. The cars were former Richard Petty Motorsports Dodges purchased after RPM's switch to Ford. Cook would run for Rookie of the Year against Kevin Conway. The team failed to make the first four races of 2010. Cook made a total of three starts in the #46 while failing to qualify for 7 races. He parted ways with Whitney Motorsports after Richmond. He attempted one race with Phoenix Racing but failed to qualify. He then attempted Martinsville in the fall with Prism Motorsports, but he failed to qualify.

In 2010, Cook was hired as a drivers coach for Truck Series team Red Horse Racing, assisting driver Justin Lofton. Cook became the team's competition director in 2011, serving that position until 2014. In 2015, he was hired by Truck and Xfinity Series team Athenian Motorsports, serving as a driver coach and spotter for drivers John Wes Townley and Dylan Lupton.

Cook remains a popular figure in the garage area and among fans.

Motorsports career results

NASCAR
(key) (Bold – Pole position awarded by qualifying time. Italics – Pole position earned by points standings or practice time. * – Most laps led.)

Sprint Cup Series

Daytona 500

Nationwide Series

Camping World Truck Series

ARCA SuperCar Series
(key) (Bold – Pole position awarded by qualifying time. Italics – Pole position earned by points standings or practice time. * – Most laps led.)

References

External links
 
 

1968 births
Living people
People from Sylvania, Ohio
Racing drivers from Ohio
NASCAR drivers
ARCA Menards Series drivers